Tholkan Enikku Manassilla is a 1977 Indian Malayalam film, directed by Hariharan and produced by G. P. Balan. The film stars Prem Nazir, Jayabharathi, Bahadoor and Junior Sheela in the lead roles. The film has musical score by Shankar–Ganesh.

Cast
 
Prem Nazir 
Jayabharathi 
Bahadoor 
Junior Sheela
K. P. Ummer 
M. G. Soman 
Jayan
Master Raghu

Soundtrack
The music was composed by Shankar–Ganesh.

References

External links
 

1977 films
1970s Malayalam-language films
Films scored by Shankar–Ganesh
Films directed by Hariharan